Maé-Bérénice Méité (born 21 September 1994) is a French figure skater. She is the 2011 Ondrej Nepela Memorial champion, the 2016 International Cup of Nice champion, the 2015 Winter Universiade silver medalist, and a six-time French national champion.

She has finished in the top six at three European Championships and represented France at the 2014 and 2018 Winter Olympics.

She is currently the 30th highest ranked ladies' singles skater in the world by the International Skating Union following the 2019-20 figure skating season.

Personal life 
Maé-Bérénice Méité, an only child, was born in Paris, France. Her parents are from Ivory Coast and Congo. Fluent in English and Spanish, she is interested in foreign languages and perfume-making. She plays the violin. After obtaining a science degree, she studied management through distance education at University of Montpellier 1. In February 2022, she developed a digital figure skating planner, called Icee Planner.

Career 
Méité began learning to skate as a five-year-old. She won the silver medal in novice ladies at her first international event, the 2007 Cup of Nice.

In addition to her singles skating, Méité participates in ice theatre with her skating club.

2008–09 season 
Méité moved up to the junior level in 2008–09, finishing eighth and sixth in her two events. She then took part in her second French Nationals and won the silver medal behind Candice Didier. Consequently, she was chosen to represent France at the 2009 World Junior Championships, where she finished in twelfth place.

2009–10 season 
In 2009–10, Méité was thirteenth at the JGP Budapest and sixth at the JGP Croatia. She won her second silver medal at French Nationals, this time behind Léna Marrocco, who was selected for the French slot at the 2010 Junior Worlds.

2010–11 season 

In 2010–11, Méité moved up to the senior level. She competed at the 2010 Skate America, finishing 8th, and the 2010 Trophée Éric Bompard, where she placed ninth. In December, she won the bronze medal at French Nationals but was nonetheless named to the French team for the 2011 European Championships, where her goal was a top ten finish. Because France did not have a direct entry to the short program in the ladies' discipline, Méité had to compete in the qualifying round; she finished second and qualified for the short program. She finished seventh in the program with a new personal best score and tenth in the free skating after falling on both triple lutzes. She finished in ninth place overall; Méité said that although her skating "wasn't perfect", she was "very satisfied with it". She was fourteenth in her Worlds debut.

2011–12 season 
Méité began the 2011–12 season at the 2011 Ondrej Nepela Memorial. She was first in the short program and second in the free skate and took her first international title. Competing in the 2011–12 Grand Prix series, she placed seventh at the 2011 NHK Trophy and sixth at the 2011 Trophée Éric Bompard. She finished thirteenth at the 2012 European Championships and completed the season as part of team France at the World Team Trophy.

2012–13 season 
Méité began the 2012–13 season at the 2012 Skate America; she was fourth in the short program and 6th overall. She finished fifth at the 2012 Trophée Éric Bompard and eleventh at the 2013 World Championships.

2013–14 season: First national title and Sochi Olympics 

Méité won her first senior national title at the 2014 French Championships. She was selected to represent France at the 2014 Winter Olympics in Sochi, where she finished tenth.

2014–15 season 
In the 2014–15 season, Méité was coached by Katia Krier in Paris. Although troubled by her right knee from mid-November 2014, she finished sixth at the 2015 European Championships in Stockholm and tenth at the 2015 World Championships in Shanghai.

Méité was diagnosed with a tear in her right patellar tendon. In April 2015, she decided to begin treatment. She did not jump for three months.

2015–16 season 
Claude Thevenard was listed as Méité's coach by October 2015. She won her third national title and placed 6th at the 2016 European Championships in Bratislava, Slovakia.

2016–17 season 
Méité started the season off at the 2016 International Cup of Nice, where she won with a score of 169.25. She placed seventh with a score of 172.65 at her only Grand Prix event that season, the 2016 Trophée de France. She placed second at the 2016 French Figure Skating Championships in December. At the 2017 Toruń Cup, she placed second with a score of 156.40. She placed sixteenth at the 2017 European Championships with a score of 145.07. She went to the 2017 World Team Trophy and placed twelfth individually.

2017–18 season: Pyeongchang Olympics 
Méité was assigned to compete at the 2017 CS Autumn Classic International, where she placed 8th. She placed eleventh at her first Grand Prix event of the season, 2017 Rostelecom Cup. She placed eighth at her second event, the 2017 Internationaux de France. In December, she won her fourth national title at the 2017 French Figure Skating Championships. She placed eighth at the 2018 European Championships.

In February, Méité competed at the 2018 Winter Olympics in Pyeongchang, South Korea. She placed ninth in the team event short program with a score of 46.62, and placed nineteenth in the ladies' singles event with a score of 159.92. During the season, she was coached by Shanetta Folle in Chicago.

2018–19 season 
Méité decided to train in Tampa, Florida, coached by Silvia Fontana and John Zimmerman. At her first event of the season, the 2018 CS Autumn Classic International, she placed third with a personal best score of 178.89. She placed tenth at the 2018 NHK Trophy with a score of 162.58. In late November, she placed eighth at the 2018 Internationaux de France.

In a November interview, Méité stated that focusing on strengthening her leg muscles, including the quadriceps, hamstrings, and calves, had effectively reduced her knee pain.  In December, Méité won her fifth national title at the 2018 French Championships.  At the 2019 European Championships, she finished seventh, two ordinals below French silver medalist Laurine Lecavelier, and as a result, Lecavelier was chosen to represent France at the 2019 World Championships.

2019–20 season 
Méité began the season with a seventh-place finish at the 2019 CS Autumn Classic International. She placed tenth at the 2019 Internationaux de France and placed eleventh at the 2019 NHK Trophy. In December, Méité won her sixth national title at the 2019 French Championships.

Competing at the 2020 European Championships, Méité placed eighth in the short program with only an under-rotation on the second part of her jump combination.  Tenth in the free skate, she placed ninth overall.  She was scheduled to compete at the World Championships in Montreal, but those were canceled as a result of the coronavirus pandemic.

2020–21 season 
Méité was scheduled to compete on the Grand Prix at the 2020 Internationaux de France, but the event was canceled as a result of the pandemic. Méité began her season at the International Challenge Cup in February, where she placed fourth. On March 1, she was named to France's team for the 2021 World Championships in Stockholm. Competing in the short program, she injured her left ankle on the takeoff to a triple toe loop and was forced to withdraw from the competition.  The French federation subsequently stated that she had torn her Achilles tendon. Méité reported having had successful surgery on March 30, stating that she planned to resume training once feasible.

2021–22 season 
Méité returned to training in October, announcing that she started to train in the Young Goose Academy with Italian Coach Lorenzo Magri in Egna, Italy, and part-time in Tampa with Fontana. She has described her injury as a "blessing in disguise". Scheduled to compete at the 2021 Internationaux de France, she withdrew as it was not enough to "present quality programs" after only returning on the ice for a month. She later withdrew from French Nationals, subsequently leaving her ineligible for the European and World Championships, stating it was the "toughest decision" she has ever made. She also withdrew from the Tallinn Cup in February. She made her competitive return in April, competing at the 2022 Egna Spring Trophy and placing 5th.

2022–23 season 
In her first appearance of the season, Méité came eleventh at the 2022 CS Nepela Memorial. In her return to the Grand Prix on home ice at the 2022 Grand Prix de France, she finished eighth. She attracted attention for presenting the winner, Loena Hendrickx, with a birthday cake after the free skate, which occurred on that occasion.

Programs

Competitive highlights 
GP: Grand Prix; CS: Challenger Series; JGP: Junior Grand Prix

Detailed results

Senior results
ISU personal bests highlighted in bold.

References

External links 

 
 Maé-Bérénice Méité at Tracings

1994 births
Figure skaters from Paris
Living people
French female single skaters
French sportspeople of Ivorian descent
French sportspeople of Republic of the Congo descent
Figure skaters at the 2014 Winter Olympics
Figure skaters at the 2018 Winter Olympics
Olympic figure skaters of France
Universiade medalists in figure skating
Universiade silver medalists for France
Medalists at the 2015 Winter Universiade
Competitors at the 2019 Winter Universiade
Black French sportspeople